XHHF-FM (branded as La Poderosa) is a Mexican Spanish-language  FM radio station that serves the Tampico, Tamaulipas, Mexico market area.

History
XHHF received its concession on February 14, 1985. It was owned by Juan Bautista Campo Rodríguez until 2003, when it was sold to Grupo Radial de Tampico.

On January 9, 2023, XHMU-FM 90.1 and XHHF exchanged formats; La Poderosa moved to 96.9.

References

Spanish-language radio stations
Radio stations in Tampico
Radio stations established in 1985
1985 establishments in Mexico